This is a list of the first minority male lawyer(s) and judge(s) in New Mexico. It includes the year in which the men were admitted to practice law (in parentheses). Also included are men who achieved other distinctions such becoming the first in their state to graduate from law school or become a political figure.

Firsts in New Mexico's history

Lawyers 
 First African American male: Fred Simms (c. 1880s)  
 First African American male to practice before the New Mexico Supreme Court: George W. Malone (1914) 
 First Mexican American male: Antonio Barreiro (c. 1932) 
First blind male: Albert T. Gonzales (1935)

State judges
 First Hispanic male (New Mexico Territorial Supreme Court): Antonio Jose Otero around 1846:  
 First Hispanic male (Supreme Court of New Mexico; Chief Justice): Eugene D. Lujan 
 First African American male: Tommy Jewell (1979) in 1984
 First African American male (district court): Tommy Jewell (1979) in 1991

Federal judges 
 First Hispanic American male (U.S. District Court for the District of New Mexico): Santiago E. Campos (1953) in 1978

Attorney General
 First Hispanic male (New Mexico Territory): Miguel Antonio Otero (1851) from 1854-1856  
 First Hispanic male (Attorney General of New Mexico): Miguel A. Otero III from 1929-1930

Political office
 First Mexican American male (U.S. Senator): Octaviano Ambrosio Larrazolo (1888) in 1928  
 First New Mexico-born Latino male (U.S. Senator): Dennis Chávez in 1935  
 First openly gay male (New Mexico Legislature): Jacob Candelaria in 2013

State Bar of New Mexico 
 First Hispanic American male president: Arturo Jaramillo in 1994  
First African American male commissioner: Ray Hamilton from 1994-1999

Firsts in local history 

 Robert Jones: First African American male lawyer in Albuquerque, Bernalillo County, New Mexico
 John EchoHawk: First Native American male (Pawnee) lawyer to graduate from the Indian law program at the University of New Mexico [Bernalillo County, New Mexico]
 Santiago Juarez: First Hispanic American male lawyer in Roswell [Chaves County, New Mexico]

See also 
 List of first minority male lawyers and judges in the United States
 List of first women lawyers and judges in the United States
 List of first women lawyers and judges in New Mexico

References 

 
Minority, New Mexico, first
Minority, New Mexico, first
Legal history of New Mexico
Lists of people from New Mexico
New Mexico lawyers